The 1891 Buchtel football team represented Buchtel College in the 1891 college football season. This season was the team's first. They did not have a coach and were led by captain Charles Weeks. They were outscored by their opponents 22–94 and finished with a record 1–3.

Schedule

References

Buchtel
Akron Zips football seasons
Buchtel football